

481001–481100 

|-bgcolor=#f2f2f2
| colspan=4 align=center | 
|}

481101–481200 

|-bgcolor=#f2f2f2
| colspan=4 align=center | 
|}

481201–481300 

|-bgcolor=#f2f2f2
| colspan=4 align=center | 
|}

481301–481400 

|-bgcolor=#f2f2f2
| colspan=4 align=center | 
|}

481401–481500 

|-bgcolor=#f2f2f2
| colspan=4 align=center | 
|}

481501–481600 

|-bgcolor=#f2f2f2
| colspan=4 align=center | 
|}

481601–481700 

|-bgcolor=#f2f2f2
| colspan=4 align=center | 
|}

481701–481800 

|-bgcolor=#f2f2f2
| colspan=4 align=center | 
|}

481801–481900 

|-bgcolor=#f2f2f2
| colspan=4 align=center | 
|}

481901–482000 

|-id=984
| 481984 Cernunnos ||  || Cernunnos, the horned god and incarnation of fertility, life and the underworld in Celtic polytheism. Druids widely encouraged the adoration of this "horned god", which became a severe obstacle to the spread of Christianity. || 
|-id=993
| 481993 Melaniezander ||  || Melanie Zander (born 1970) is a German actress who had three decades of amateur stage performances. Working at the European Space Agency until 2016, she was deeply admired for her sense of humour, efficiency and devotion to her colleagues. || 
|}

References 

481001-482000